Daniel P. Reigle (February 19, 1841 – March 19, 1917) was a Union Army soldier during the American Civil War. He received the Medal of Honor for gallantry during the Battle of Cedar Creek fought near Middletown, Virginia on October 19, 1864. The battle was the decisive engagement of Major General Philip Sheridan’s Valley Campaigns of 1864 and was the largest battle fought in the Shenandoah Valley.

Medal of Honor citation
“The President of the United States of America, in the name of Congress, takes pleasure in presenting the Medal of Honor to Corporal Daniel P. Reigle, United States Army, for extraordinary heroism on 19 October 1864, while serving with Company F, 87th Pennsylvania Infantry, in action at Cedar Creek, Virginia, for gallantry while rushing forward to capture a Confederate flag at the stone fence where the enemy's last stand was made.”

Reigle joined the army from Adams County, Pennsylvania in September 1861. He was later promoted to sergeant, and was mustered out in June 1865.

See also

List of Medal of Honor recipients
List of American Civil War Medal of Honor recipients: G-L

References

External links
Military Times Hall of Valor
 Findagrave entry

1841 births
1917 deaths
People from Adams County, Pennsylvania
People of Pennsylvania in the American Civil War
Union Army soldiers
United States Army Medal of Honor recipients
American Civil War recipients of the Medal of Honor